Parinay Phuke is an Indian politician of the BJP. On 23 November 2016 he was elected to the Maharashtra Legislative Council from Local Areas Constituency of Nagpur and Currently Became State Minister of Maharashtra State was previously an independent corporator in the Nagpur Municipal Corporation from Ambazari ward and is the city-vice president of the BJP.

References

Year of birth missing (living people)
Living people
Bharatiya Janata Party politicians from Maharashtra